Adrià Altimira Reynaldos (born 28 March 2001) is a Spanish footballer who plays for FC Andorra. Mainly a right back, he can also play as a right winger.

Club career
Born in Cardedeu, Barcelona, Catalonia, Altimira joined FC Barcelona's La Masia in 2008, from EC Granollers. On 27 August 2020, after finishing his formation, he moved to Croatian side NK Lokomotiva Zagreb, but terminated his contract shortly after and returned to his home country, signing for Segunda División B side UD Melilla on 7 October.

Altimira made his senior debut on 1 November 2020, playing the last 30 minutes in a 1–0 home win over CF Villanovense. He scored his first senior goal the following 16 May, netting his team's third in a 3–0 home win over Atlético Madrid B.

On 1 July 2021, Altimira joined FC Andorra in the newly-created Primera División RFEF. He featured regularly for the side during the campaign, appearing in 29 matches overall as his side achieved a first-ever promotion to Segunda División.

Altimira made his professional debut on 15 August 2022, starting in a 1–0 away win over Real Oviedo.

Personal life
Altimira's uncle and cousin are also involved with football: his uncle Aureli was also a footballer who played as a forward and later became a coach, while his cousin Sergi is a midfielder; both were also Barcelona youth graduates.

References

External links

2001 births
Living people
People from Vallès Oriental
Sportspeople from the Province of Barcelona
Spanish footballers
Footballers from Catalonia
Association football defenders
Primera Federación players
Segunda División B players
UD Melilla footballers
FC Andorra players
NK Lokomotiva Zagreb players
Spanish expatriate footballers
Expatriate footballers in Andorra
Expatriate footballers in Croatia
Spanish expatriate sportspeople in Andorra
Spanish expatriate sportspeople in Croatia